Joey J. Long (born July 15, 1970) is an American former professional baseball pitcher. He played during one season in Major League Baseball (MLB) for the San Diego Padres. He was drafted by the Padres in the 5th round of the 1991  Major League Baseball draft. He now lives in Ohio, near a small town called Rosewood. He also has a daughter.

External links

1970 births
Living people
Altoona Curve players
American expatriate baseball players in Canada
Baseball players from Ohio
Kent State Golden Flashes baseball players
Las Vegas Stars (baseball) players
Major League Baseball pitchers
Memphis Chicks players
Nashville Sounds players
Newark Bears players
Ottawa Lynx players
People from Sidney, Ohio
Rancho Cucamonga Quakes players
San Diego Padres players
Spokane Indians players
Waterloo Diamonds players